Sinistrella is a genus of sea snails, marine gastropod mollusks unassigned in the superfamily Conoidea.

Species
Species within the genus Sinistrella include:
 Sinistrella sinistralis (Petit de la Saussaye, 1839)

References

Conoidea
Monotypic gastropod genera